The Liberal Democrats (Arabic: حِزب الديمقراطيين الأحرار, Hizb Al-Demokhrateen Al-Ahrar) is a political party in Sudan. 
At the last legislative elections, December 2000, the party won one seat. At the presidential elections of the same moment, its candidate Dr. Al-Samuel Hussein Osman Mansour won 1.0% of the votes.

References
On the Sudanese parliamentary and presidential elections in Arabicnews.com. Retrieved June 30, 2006

Political parties in Sudan
Liberal parties in Sudan